The 2018 African U-17 Women's World Cup Qualifying Tournament was the 6th edition of the African U-17 Women's World Cup Qualifying Tournament, the biennial international youth football competition organised by the Confederation of African Football (CAF) to determine which women's under-17 national teams from Africa qualify for the FIFA U-17 Women's World Cup.

Players born on or after 1 January 2001 are eligible to compete in the tournament. Three teams qualify from this tournament for the 2018 FIFA U-17 Women's World Cup in Uruguay as the CAF representatives.

For the first time Nigeria failed to qualify for the Women's World Cup at any age level (senior, U-20 or U-17).

Teams
A total of 17 (out of 54) CAF member national teams entered the qualifying rounds. The draw was announced by the CAF on 7 August 2017.

Notes
Teams in bold qualified for the World Cup.

Did not enter

Format
Qualification ties are played on a home-and-away two-legged basis. If the aggregate score is tied after the second leg, the away goals rule is applied, and if still tied, the penalty shoot-out (no extra time) is used to determine the winner.

Schedule
The schedule of the qualifying rounds is as follows.

Bracket
The three winners of the second round qualify for the 2018 FIFA U-17 Women's World Cup.

Preliminary round

|}

Djibouti won on walkover after Libya withdrew.

Gambia won on walkover after Sierra Leone withdrew prior to the second leg.

Botswana won 6–5 on aggregate.

Ethiopia won on walkover after Kenya withdrew.

Algeria won on walkover after Mali withdrew.

First round

|}

Djibouti won on walkover after Tunisia withdrew.

Ghana won 7–1 on aggregate.

South Africa won 11–6 on aggregate.

Morocco won on walkover after Equatorial Guinea withdrew.

1–1 on aggregate. Nigeria won on away goals.

Cameroon won 11–0 on aggregate.

Second round
Winners qualify for 2018 FIFA U-17 Women's World Cup.

|}

Ghana won 19–0 on aggregate.

South Africa won 6–1 on aggregate.

3–3 on aggregate. Cameroon won on away goals.

Qualified teams for FIFA U-17 Women's World Cup
The following three teams from CAF qualified for the 2018 FIFA U-17 Women's World Cup.

1 Bold indicates champions for that year. Italic indicates hosts for that year.

Goalscorers
12 goals

 Mukarama Abdulai

5 goals

 Alice Kameni
 Marie Ngah

4 goals

 Michelle Abueng
 Karabo Dhlamini
 Miche Minnies
 Christabel Phiri

3 goals

 Nina Norshie
 Thambolinye Mzoneli

2 goals

 Letso Botlhale
 Lone Gaofetoge
 Obonetse Oratile Rathari
 Leungo Senwelo
 Viviane Mefire
 Fuseina Mumuni
 Suzzy Teye
 Precious Martha

1 goal

 Florence Fanta
 Fatima Kome
 Tarikuwa Debiso
 Ola Buwaro
 Aminata Camara
 Cathrine Jatta
 Fatoumata Sowe
 Adama Alhassan
 Azuma Bugrie
 Jacqueline Owusu
 Millot Pokuaa
 Barikisu Rahman
 Victoria Teye
 Abigail Tutuawaa
 Noura Mouadni
 Osaretin Ikekhua
 Joy Jerry
 Sibulele Holweni
 Kaylin Jordaan
 Sphumelele Shamase
 Thubelihle Shamase
 Jessica Wade
 Lydia Mubanga

1 own goal

 Tshegofatso Mosotho (against South Africa)

References

External links
African Qualifiers FIFA U-17 WWC-URUGUAY 2018, CAFonline.com

2018
Women's U-17 World Cup Qualifying Tournament
Women's U-17 World Cup Qualifying Tournament
African U-17 World Cup Qualifying Tournament
African U-17 World Cup Qualifying Tournament
African U-17 Women's World Cup Qualifying Tournament
African U-17 Women's World Cup Qualifying Tournament
October 2017 sports events in Africa
December 2017 sports events in Africa
February 2018 sports events in Africa